Ulyanovka is a rural locality (a village) in Chernushinsky District, Perm Krai, Russia. The population was 244 as of 2010. There are 10 streets.

Geography 
Ulyanovka is located 3 km southwest of Chernushka (the district's administrative centre) by road. Chernushka is the nearest rural locality.

References 

Rural localities in Chernushinsky District